The National Democratic Revival (RDK, НДП, Nacionalna Demokratska Prerodba, NDP) is a political party in North Macedonia that represents the Albanian population.

Performance 

In the 2011 parliamentary election, the party's first election, it received 2.67% of the popular vote, winning 2 seats in the Macedonian Parliament.

References

Albanian political parties in North Macedonia
Conservative parties in North Macedonia